This article details the international fixtures and results of the Philippines women's national football team.

2020–2029

2023

2022

2021

2010–2019

2019

2018

2017

2016

2015

2013

2012

2011

2000–2009

2009

2008

2007

2005

2004

2003

2001

1990–1999

1999

1997

1995

1993

1981–1989

1989

1985

1983

1981

Notes

References

Women's national association football team results
Results